Jonathan Stuart Cerullo (born December 21, 1960) is an American director and choreographer, executive producer, and former performer. Cerullo is known for his work on Broadway, Off-Broadway, and regionally. He has also worked in circus, film, and television.

Personal life 
Cerullo received a Bachelor of Fine Arts degree in directing from Emerson College in 1982. He is also the great, great nephew of the Italian operatic soprano Erminia Frezzolini.

Cerullo's home has been featured in The New York Times with the article by Constance Rosenblum entitled, "Pocket-Sized on West 47th Street", the article was also selected to be part of her book entitled Habitats: Private Lives in the Big City published by NYU Press, March 25, 2013.

Career

1986-2014
Cerullo's first major role was in the US National III tour of the Broadway musical Cats as Skimbleshanks the Railway Cat, which ran from September 1986 to August 1988. He was Big Daddy in the West Coast production of Sweet Charity starring TONY award winner, Donna McKechnie. Appeared at the Goodspeed Opera House, North Shore Music Theatre, the Ogunquit Playhouse and The Cape Playhouse. He was a voting member of the Lucille Lortel Award for Off-Broadway productions, is a member of the Stage Directors and Choreographers Society, the Dramatist Guild and the Actors' Equity Association.

He made his Broadway debut in 1984, as a Production Assistant on the musical, The Three Musketeers directed and choreographed by TONY award-winning director, Joe Layton, also on Broadway, as a performer, Cerullo was a featured dancer in the 1988 Broadway musical Legs Diamond, starring Peter Allen, and was also featured on the BMG-RCA Original Cast Recording for the musical.

In 1992 he was the Dance Captain for Circle in the Square's Broadway production of Anna Karenina. and the Broadway musical, Band In Berlin based on the lives of the Comedian Harmonists.  Cerullo worked with the late Frank Gorshin on the Broadway production of, "Say Goodnight Gracie", by Rupert Holmes at the Helen Hayes Theatre as his dance instructor and created the soft shoe routine for Gorshin as George Burns. In 1992 in Los Angeles Cerullo worked with and taught Uta Hagen, on what was to be her last stage performance for the "Six Dance Lesson in Six Weeks", by Richard Alfieri at the Geffen Playhouse, David Hyde Pierce was her co-star, and the production was choreographed by Kay Cole. He later interviewed Kay Cole for TheaterMania.

After working with him on the Broadway musical, Anna Karenina, choreographer and director Patricia Birch began mentoring Cerullo. Through this partnership, Cerullo was hired as Associate Choreograph for Birch on the Public Broadcasting Service (PBS) series Great Performances for This Is The Moment, starring Donny Osmond and Vanessa Williams, and Natalie Cole's Untraditional Traditional Christmas Special. Cerullo was also the Assistant Choreographer to Patrica on the films The First Wives Club, starring Bette Midler, Diane Keaton and Goldie Hawn and The Cowboy Way' starring Woody Harrelson'. Cerullo also worked with Pat Birch on the St. Ann's Warehouse production of Band in Berlin as the Assistant Director and Choreographer.

Cerullo directed the original musical Fools' Paradise, by Jim Camacho. At Lincoln Center, he choreographed the productions of Picturesque and Carnevale! for the Big Apple Circus. and received a Village Voice 2003 Voice Choices Best Dance Pick.  His work for the production was detailed in Backstage, Theatre Artists Take on Challenges of the Circus, by Simi Horwitz.

In 2003, Cerullo choreographed Orpheus Descending for Great Performances Evening At Pops with the Boston Pops conducted by maestro, Keith Lockhart. He was Special Effects Movement Consultant to Bette Midler on the film "The Stepford Wives" in 2004. He also conceived directed and produced the video tribute to Mr. George Abbott for the "Mr. Abbott Award" for Lifetime Achievement in the American Theatre presented annually by the Stage Director and Choreographers Society.

Cerullo received the Newhouse Scholarship from Career Transition for Dancers to form his production company called JSCTheatricals, LLC. In October 2013 he made his debut as Producer under his newly formed company for the Grand Central Terminal's Centennial Celebration presentation of Orphan Train, The Musical directed by Patricia Birch.

2015-present
Cerullo directed the world premiere of Windywoo and Her Naughty Naughty Pets a new musical for children of all ages, for the 2015 NY Musical Festival. Cerullo directed Fictitious, a new musical by Paul Cozby and Tom Hyndman, for the Theatre Now New York SOUND BITES 3.0 annual 10-minute musical festival, for which he received the award for Best Director.

In 2016, he directed the NYC premiere of RISE, written and performed by Scott Barry at the Museum of Sex. Cerullo also had the honor of working on the 30th anniversary of the Easter Bonnet Competition at the Minskoff Theater by conceiving, directing and choreographing the Bucket Brigade Tribute. In 2016, for the New York Musical Festival, Cerullo choreographed the production of Lisa and Leonardo written by Donya Lane and Ed McNamee. Cerullo was interviewed by Bob Rizzo for BroadwayWorld.com, Also in 2016 Cerullo directed the NY premiere of CHANCE, the musical written by Richard Isen for the Fresh Fruit Festival. His received positive reviews for his work in OUTERSTAGE. Finally in 2016 he directed and staged the NY Premiere of The Fifth Dentist In Search Of Sid's Treasure A Tribute to the Sultan Of Striptease at the NY International Fringe Festival. Cerullo was quoted in The New York Times about his involvement with this production.

He also produced Conrack, The Musical based on Pat Conroy's the "Water is Wide", featuring Tony Award nominees Vivian Reed and Ernestine Jackson and Drama Desk nominee A.J. Shively at York Theatre Company Development Reading Series By Granville Burgess and music By Emmy Award-winning composer Doug Katsaros directed by Stuart Ross. Cerullo is preparing Willie & Me, The Emmett Kelly Story. This was written by Cerullo and Stephen Woodburn.

Cerullo is the producer and director of the Broadway musical Legs Diamond at Feinstein's 54 Below with original cast members, two-time Tony Award nominee Christine Andreas, Tony Award nominee Brenda Braxton, and two-time Tony nominee Bob Stillman and Randall Edwards. He directed and choreographed an all-male version of Rodgers and Hart musical comedy, The Boys From Syracuse for Musicals Tonight! Off-Broadway at the Lion Theatre on Theatre Row. John Soltes Interview Rediscovering Rodgers and Hart's "". Jonathan staged Amas Musical Theatre's No Foolin' A Musical Confection. Honoring Tony Award winner, Grammy Award winner, Micki Grant Hosted by Brad Oscar.

Bob Ost, executive director, president, and co-founder of Theatre Resources Unlimited TRU,  hired Cerullo to direct their 2018 TRU LOVE benefit honoring John Chatterton, Baayork Lee, and her National Asian Artists Project. The event featured Tony Award winner Priscilla Lopez, Donna McKechnie, and Brenda Braxton. Amas Musical Theatre hired Jonathan to write and direct Amas@50 Anniversary Concert. Honorary Chair ~ Whoopi Goldberg, Hosted by Lillias White and featuring Leslie Uggams, Vivian Reed, Christopher Jackson actor, Lance Roberts, Len Cariou, N'Kenge, Soara-Joye Ross, Elijah Ahmad Lewis and a Special video appearance by Petula Clark. The gala is honoring Harry Belafonte, Sharleen Cooper Cohen, Donna Trinkoff, and Shelly Berger manager of The Temptations. In 2019 he was made an Artistic Associate at Amas Music Theatre.

He produced the James Parks Morton Interfaith Award honoring Dr. Ruth Westheimer and Bishop Curry in 2019. The event was hosted by Mo Rocca.

2020 Cerullo directed Jen Chapin's Essential Stories''. Jen Chapin is the daughter of the late singer-songwriter Harry Chapin. He also conceived, produced, and directed With Love, Now and Forever! CATSCOVIDRELIEF for Broadway Cares COVID-19 Emergency Relief Fund for Actors Fund of America. After 34 years the third National Touring Company of Cats (musical) reunited for this special event hosted by Broadway and TV star Brian Stokes Mitchell and Tom Viola. 

He also appears on Stars in the House as well as Broadway Network Podcast Cerullo, in 2021, made his Los Angeles directorial debut at the award-winning theatre, The Blank Theatre with Scott Barry's Hard On Love starring Los Angeles Drama Critics Award-winner Rob Nagle and from RuPaul's Drag Race Brita Filter aka Jesse Havea. Cerullo wrote the script for Amas Musical Theatre's 2021 gala AMAS YOU LOVE, a Heart to Heart Celebration. Directed by Maria Torres, hosted by Justina Machado, and receiving the 2021 Rosie Award was Tony Award-winner Lillias White.

Awards and nominations

References

External links 
 
 
 
 JSCTheatricals, LLC
 www.willieandme.com
 www.thenaughtynaughtypetsmusical.com

1960 births
Living people
American choreographers
American theatre directors
American male actors
Actors from Mount Vernon, New York